The Cable TV Tower (Chinese: 有線電視大樓) is a skyscraper located in Tsuen Wan in Hong Kong which was completed in 1993. The skyscraper is also the tallest 'office / industrial' building in the city (though many purely commercial properties are much higher). Attached to the southeast side of the building is an intermodal container (shipping container) elevator capable of lifting 40-foot containers to thirty floors up.

See also
List of tallest buildings in Hong Kong

References

Skyscraper office buildings in Hong Kong
Industrial buildings completed in 1993
Office buildings completed in 1993
Tsuen Wan
Skyscrapers in Hong Kong